Ukrainian Automobile Corporation JSC, or UkrAVTO, is a Ukrainian automobile manufacturing and service company, as well as Ukraine's largest automobile distributor.

History
It was founded in 1969 as the Ukraine Motor Vehicles Maintenance Department - a reorganisation of diverse car manufacturing, parts, sales and maintenance agencies in the then Ukrainian SSR. It was restructured after Ukraininan independence, then corporatized and fully privatised in 1995. In 2002, it took over the major Ukrainian automobile  manufacturer ZAZ/AvtoZAZ, after the bankruptcy of Daewoo Motors. The resulting merged ZAZ division is the largest subsidiary of UkrAVTO. In 2005, it took over the Polish Daewoo subsidiary Fabryka Samochodów Osobowych (FSO) which had been supplying it with car parts.

UkrAVTO owns the largest network of manufacturing and assembling facilities, service stations and auto dealerships in Ukraine. It currently manufactures cars for General Motors (particularly models originally designed for Daewoo) and assembles cars for Dacia. UkrAVTO formerly builds cars under its own name, particularly the Slavuta and Tavria Nova models - lines it inherited from the Soviet era.

It also acts as Ukrainian distributor and authorised service organisation for a number of foreign cars, car parts and accessories manufacturers, including DaimlerChrysler, General Motors, Toyota, Nissan, Dacia, Dongfeng Motors and Tata Motors.

Since 1983, UkrAVTO has been chaired by Tariel Vasadze. Now he is also the controlling shareholder of the corporation, as well as of the whole oligarch-like "UkrAVTO Group" united around UkrAVTO JSC.

External links
 Official website
 UkrAVTO JSC dossier entry at ProUA
 UkrAVTO Group dossier entry at ProUA
 FSO and UkrAvto

1969 establishments in Ukraine
Car manufacturers of Ukraine
Vehicle manufacturing companies established in 1969
Automotive companies of Ukraine
Automotive companies of the Soviet Union
Motor vehicle assembly plants in Ukraine
Ukrainian brands